Francis Robert George Henry James 'Flossie’ Forsyth was a British criminal who, at 18 years old, became one of the youngest persons to be executed in Britain in the 20th century.  He was hanged on 10 November 1960 at Wandsworth Prison for the murder of Allan Edward John Jee.

The murder

Forsyth, a road worker, was with unemployed driver Norman James 'Flash' Harris aged 23, coalman Christopher Louis Darby aged 20, and unemployed labourer Terence Lutt aged 17. At about 11.17 p.m. on Saturday 25 June 1960, on a footpath at the bottom of James Street, Hounslow, Middlesex, they set upon engineer Allan Edward John Jee aged 23, who was walking home after an evening with his fiancée, Jacqueline Herbert, to whom he had become engaged the previous day. Jee was about 20 yards from his home when he was attacked. The gang kicked him unconscious and left him bleeding with a fractured skull. He died from a cerebral contusion two days later at the West Middlesex Hospital in Isleworth.

At the time Forsyth was on bail for assaulting two police officers at Heathrow Airport, and had been detained in an Approved School.

Anthony Cowell was standing at the other end of James Street and gave police a detailed description of the four. A friend of Forsyth's, Kevin Cullinan, told police on 18 July that Forsyth had been boasting about the attack, and gave the names of the three others whom he had seen with Forsyth in a coffee bar on the night. The four were arrested two days later and traces of Jee's blood were found on Forsyth's winkle-picker shoes and trousers.

The trial

It was found during trial at the Old Bailey that Lutt had struck the first blow upon Jee but the kicking had been administered by Forsyth. Only Darby claimed to have used no violence and the charge against him was reduced to non-capital murder.

Pathologist Dr. Donald Teare testified that Jee had been kicked five times in the head.

Forsyth, Harris and Lutt were convicted of capital murder. Forsyth and Harris were sentenced to death by Mr Justice Winn on 26 September 1960 under the Homicide Act 1957, which defined murder in the course of robbery as a capital crime (although nothing had actually been taken). As a minor, Lutt was sentenced to be detained at Her Majesty's pleasure, while Darby was convicted of non-capital murder and sentenced to life imprisonment. Lutt and Darby were released in 1970.

Execution

Forsyth's and Harris' appeals were dismissed on 24 October 1960. A petition for clemency signed by 3,000 people including The Earl of Harewood, Donald Soper, Gilbert Harding, Kingsley Amis and J. B. Priestley was turned down on 8 November 1960. The executions took place two days later at 9 a.m. Forsyth was hanged by Harry Allen (assisted by Royston Rickard) and given a drop of seven feet and two inches. Harris was hanged at Pentonville Prison by Robert Leslie Stewart (assisted by H. F. Robinson).

Forsyth, who claimed his girlfriend Margaret Caitlin was expecting his child in January 1961, was the last 18-year-old to be hanged in Britain. 19-year-old Anthony Miller became the last teenager to be executed in Britain when he was hanged in Glasgow just over a month later, on 22 December 1960. Three other eighteen-year-olds were executed in Britain in the 20th century, Henry Julius Jacoby in 1922, Arthur Bishop in 1925, and German POW Armin Kuhne in 1945. The Children and Young Persons Act 1933 fixed the minimum age for a prisoner to be hanged at 18 years.

Victor Terry
On the morning of 10 November, 20-year-old Victor Terry, a friend of Forsyth's, heard about the executions on his car radio. One hour later, he shot dead a security guard at a bank in Worthing, West Sussex during a robbery. Terry claimed to have been possessed by the spirit of American gangster  Jack "Legs" Diamond. He was convicted of capital murder and hanged on the same gallows as Forsyth, on 25 May 1961.

Bibliography
 John J. Eddleston, The Encyclopedia of Executions, p. 895, John Blake

References

External links
 Article on Francis Forsyth, Norman Harris and Victor Terry
 Extract from Execution of the Day website

1942 births
1960 deaths
20th-century executions by England and Wales
People executed for murder
Executed British people
1960 murders in the United Kingdom
1960 in England
People executed by the United Kingdom by hanging